The Islamic Labor Front – ILF (Arabic: جبهة العمل الإسلامي | Jabhat al-A'amal al-Islamy), is a gathering of several Islamic parties and personalities in Lebanon led by Sunni Daaiya Fathi Yakan.

Origins
Founded in 2006, the gathering merged out from a conflict within the Islamic group on either becoming part of the anti-Syrian March 14 Alliance or the pro-Syrian March 8 Alliance.

The ILF is currently allied to Hezbollah and is part of the opposition. One of its members, Sheikh Saadeddine Ghaya, was killed in Tripoli in November 2013.

See also
Bab al-Tabbaneh–Jabal Mohsen conflict
Hezbollah 
Lebanese Civil War
Islamic Unification Movement
Syrian Civil War spillover in Lebanon
2nd Infantry Brigade (Lebanon)

References

2006 establishments in Lebanon
Islamic political parties in Lebanon
Political parties established in 2006
Political party alliances in Lebanon